Diane Lim is an economist and writer known for translating economic research into policy recommendations and for explaining economic issues for lay audiences. She has previously served as Senior Advisor at the Penn Wharton Budget Model, Principal at District Economics Group, principal economist for the Conference Board, Chief Economist for the Pew Charitable Trusts, Chief Economist for the Concord Coalition, Chief Economist for the House Budget Committee, Research Director of the Budgeting for National Priorities project of the Brookings Institution, Chief Economist for the House Ways and Means Committee Democrats, and Principal Economist for the Democratic members of the Joint Economic Committee.  In 2009, The Wall Street Journal named her website, EconomistMom.com, one of the top economics blogs.

She also teaches tax and budget policy and behavioral economics courses at George Washington University and at Georgetown University.  She is a past president of the National Tax Association, and has been a commentator on the Marketplace radio program.

Research 
Her current research focuses on the influence of public policies on household and business behavior and how individual-level characteristics and decisions drive macroeconomic trends. Her past publications focused on tax incidence, fiscal policy and the U.S. Federal budget.

Selected works

References 

American women economists
20th-century American economists
21st-century American economists
University of Virginia alumni
University of Michigan alumni
Living people
Year of birth missing (living people)
20th-century American women
21st-century American women
Brown University alumni